Mari Andersson (born 5 July 1986) is a former professional tennis player from Sweden.

Biography
Born in Seoul, South Korea, Andersson was adopted at three months of age by a Swedish couple and grew up in Båstad.

Andersson made her only WTA Tour main-draw appearance at the 2006 Nordea Nordic Light Open, where she featured in the women's doubles as a lucky loser from qualifying, partnering Nadja Roma.

From 2006 to 2007, she played in the doubles rubber of four Fed Cup ties for Sweden, winning all matches.

On the ITF circuit, she won a total of 14 titles, five in singles and nine in doubles.

Retiring from the tour in 2008, Andersson moved to the United States and played collegiate tennis for the California Golden Bears of UC Berkeley. She partnered with Jana Juricová to win the NCAA doubles championship in 2009.

ITF finals

Singles: 5 (5–0)

Doubles: 11 (9–2)

See also
 List of Sweden Fed Cup team representatives

References

External links
 
 
 

1986 births
Living people
Swedish female tennis players
California Golden Bears women's tennis players
Swedish adoptees
Swedish people of South Korean descent
South Korean emigrants
Tennis players from Seoul
People from Båstad Municipality
Sportspeople from Skåne County
20th-century Swedish women
21st-century Swedish women